Andrew Shulman (born 1960 in London, England) is an English virtuoso cellist, conductor and composer. He is currently the principal cellist of the Los Angeles Chamber Orchestra and maintains his cello studio at the University of Southern California's Thornton School of Music in Los Angeles, California.

Career
He was formerly principal cellist of the Philharmonia Orchestra, the Academy of St. Martin-in-the-Fields, the Los Angeles Philharmonic Orchestra and the Royal Liverpool Philharmonic Orchestra. He was appointed principal cello of London's Philharmonia at the age of 22 by Riccardo Muti. In 1989 he became the first British cellist to win the United States New England Conservatory/Piatigorsky Artist Award

Performances
He has performed cello concertos with the City of Birmingham Symphony, Utah Symphony, Royal Liverpool Philharmonic, BBC Scottish Symphony Orchestra, the Philharmonia, the Los Angeles Philharmonic, the Gothenburg Symphony and the Singapore Symphony. Conductors include Sinopoli, Salonen, Rattle, Stern, Kahane, Atherton, Zander, Welser-Most, Marriner, Brown, Davis and Bychkov.

He also performed the Haydn D major, Tchaikovsky Rococo Variations and Strauss' Don Quixote at the Royal Festival Hall (with Sir Simon Rattle, broadcast live on the BBC) and the Hollywood Bowl (with Esa-Pekka Salonen).

Awards
He was the first Briton to win the New England Conservatory/Piatigorsky Artist Award, in 1990. He won the major cello prizes at the Royal College of Music and won the Suggia gift and two Countess of Munster Awards.

Recordings
Recent recordings include Broughton's cello concerto, Stone's cello concerto 'Siddhartha', Broughton's sonata for cello and piano and Zigman's Rhapsody for cello and piano. He has recorded 26 CDs with the Britten Quartet (EMI and Collins) and has made solo recordings for Virgin (Vivaldi) and EMI (Janáček). He made a world premiere recording of Frederick Delius's complete cello works, and was solo cello on Elton John's Candle in the Wind 1997. Shulman has also arranged and recorded for American post-punk revival band Louis XIV and has been featured on their last three albums.

Conducting
As conductor, he has performed in Europe and the USA and has conducted the world premieres of several major works, as well as collaborating with some notable soloists, including Rafael Wallfisch, Colin Carr and Bernard d'Ascoli. He was invited by the Britten-Pears Foundation to conduct the first performance of an important early work by Benjamin Britten, with the Britten-Pears Orchestra at Britten's Snape Maltings in Suffolk, England. He has conducted the Los Angeles Chamber Orchestra, the Saloman Orchestra, the Brandon Hill Chamber Orchestra, The Jonkoping Orchestra, the Ambache Chamber Orchestra, the Peninsula Symphony Orchestra, the Leicester Symphony Orchestra, the Royal College of Music Symphony Orchestra, the Royal College of Music Chamber Orchestra, the Ulster Youth Orchestra, the Guildhall School of Music Chamber Orchestra and the Hertfordshire Symphony Orchestra. He is currently Principal Guest Conductor of the Culver City Symphony Orchestra.

Composition
Shulman also composes, and recently premiered his Smaller Music For Strings in the UK, as well as collaborating with the German rock guitarist Uli Jon Roth in performances in Hollywood. His electric cello rock instrumental H.A.N.D was a winner in the International Songwriting Competition of 2007.

Music education
Shulman studied cello with Amaryllis Fleming, Joan Dickson, Jacqueline du Pré and William Pleeth. He received an 'Honorary RCM' from The Queen Mother in 1986, and subsequently became a professor at the Royal College of Music. He has given masterclasses in Europe, Scandinavia, Russia, the Ukraine, the USA, South America, the Far East and New Zealand.

After winning the New England Conservatory/Piatigorsky Artist Award in Boston, he returned to the USA to teach and give concerts. Now residing in Los Angeles, he has given masterclasses at The Corwin Awards, USC, UCLA and The Aspen Music Festival. He is a regular guest artist at the La Jolla Summerfest, Aspen, Las Vegas and Mainly Mozart summer music festivals, and last season recorded three new cello concertos written for him. These were written by Christopher Stone, Nathaniel Levisay and Maria Newman.
He has premiered new sonatas and concertos by Broughton, Zigman, Kaska, Newman and next season he premieres James Newton Howard's cello concerto with the Los Angeles Chamber Orchestra. The European premiere is scheduled for June 2021 with the Philharmonia Orchestra and Salonen.
This season CDs of concertos by Stone and Broughton are being released on all formats.
He formed the Los Angeles Piano Trio in 2020 http://www.losangelespianotrio.com and is a member of the New Hollywood String Quartet http://www.newhollywoodstringquartet.com

References

External links 
 

English classical cellists
English conductors (music)
British male conductors (music)
Aspen Music Festival and School faculty
British music educators
British rock cellists
Living people
1960 births
Musicians from London
21st-century British conductors (music)
21st-century British male musicians
Centaur Records artists
21st-century cellists